Blastozoa is a subphylum of extinct Echinoderms characterized by the presence of specialized respiratory structures and brachiole plates used for feeding. It ranged from the Cambrian to the Permian.

References

External links
Harvard: Subphylum Blastozoa 

 
Paleozoic echinoderms
Cambrian echinoderms
Silurian echinoderms
Ordovician echinoderms
Devonian echinoderms
Permian echinoderms
Animal subphyla